An avicide is any substance (normally a chemical) used to kill birds.  

Commonly used avicides include strychnine (also used as rodenticide and predacide), DRC-1339 (3-chloro-4-methylaniline hydrochloride, Starlicide) and CPTH (3-chloro-p-toluidine, the free base of Starlicide), Avitrol (4-aminopyridine) and chloralose (also used as rodenticide). In the past, highly concentrated formulations of parathion in diesel oil were sprayed by aircraft over birds' nesting colonies.

Avicides are banned in many countries because of their ecological impact, which is poorly studied. They are still used in the United States, Canada, Australia and New Zealand. The practice is criticized by animal rights advocates and those who kill birds with guns and traps. Pigeon fanciers sometimes poison problematic birds of prey, even in countries like Russia and Ukraine where avicides are illegal.

See also
Bird kill

References

External links 
4-Aminopyridine
Exposure of nontarget birds to DRC-1339 avicide in fall baited sunflower fields
BIOONE Online Journals  - BIOONE Online Journals Access Control
E554-95 Guide for Use and Development of Strychnine as an Avicide (Withdrawn 2000)
IngentaConnect DRC-1339 avicide fails to protect ripening sunflowers

 
Biocides